Federico Andrés Mancuello (born 26 March 1989) is an Argentine professional footballer who plays as central midfielder for Liga MX club Puebla.
Mancuello started his career at Independiente and had a brief loan at Belgrano during 2011–12 season. He moved to Flamengo at the beginning of the 2016 season. He also represented Argentina on two occasions scoring one goal.

Club career

Early years
Mancuello made his league debut for Independiente in a 1–2 home defeat by Arsenal de Sarandí on 14 December 2008. He scored his first goal for the club im a 5–1 away defeat to Lanús on 5 April 2009. He scored again on 11 April in a 2–1 win over Huracán.

Loan to Belgrano
After not being considered by Independiente's coach Antonio Mohamed in July 2011 Mancuello was loaned to Club Atlético Belgrano for one year. On 26 October he scored his first and only goal in a 1–0 victory against Tigre. In January 2012 Mancuello suffered an injury in a match of the Copa Argentina which kept him out of the fields for several weeks when he was being a key player of his team.

Return to Independiente

Flamengo

2016 season
On January 6, 2016 Mancuello was signed by Brazilian club Flamengo for a fee of R$12 million. In the first half of the season Mancuello didn't perform as expected due to some injuries, playing all of his 12 matches as a starter and scoring 3 goals. As the 2016 Série A started he lost his status of starter, but established himself as of the most important substitutes of the team.

On 6 August 2016 Mancuello scored his first Série A goal in a 1-0 win against Atlético Paranaense in Kléber Andrade Stadium, the game-winner goal was scored in a beautiful back heel flick. On 28 August 2016, against Chapecoense, he substituted Éverton on the 62nd minute and scored his second Série A in the injury time, Flamengo won the match 3-1 at Arena Condá. His third Série A goal was, once again, a game-winner, this time against Cruzeiro in a beautiful placed shot in the 87th minute. In his first season at Flamengo, Mancuello made 36 appearances and scored five goals in all competitions.

International career
On March 20, 2015 Mancuello was called up by Argentine coach Gerardo Martino for the friendly matches against El Salvador on March 28 and Ecuador on March 31, 2015. He made his debut against El Salvador at Fedex Field, replacing Ángel Di María in the second half and scoring a debut goal from a free kick at the end of the match.
In May, he was selected for the preliminary squad for the 2015 Copa América but he wasn't considered for the definitive draft.

Career statistics

Club career

International career

Honours
Independiente
 Copa Sudamericana: 2010

Flamengo
 Campeonato Carioca: 2017

Cruzeiro
 Copa do Brasil: 2018
Campeonato Mineiro: 2018

References

External links
 
 
  
 Argentine Primera statistics at Fútbol XXI 
 

1989 births
Living people
People from Reconquista, Santa Fe
Argentine footballers
Association football midfielders
Club Atlético Independiente footballers
Argentine Primera División players
Argentina international footballers
Club Atlético Belgrano footballers
CR Flamengo footballers
Cruzeiro Esporte Clube players
Expatriate footballers in Brazil
Campeonato Brasileiro Série A players
Argentine expatriate footballers
Sportspeople from Santa Fe Province